The 1930 Baltic Cup was the third playing of the Baltic Cup football tournament. It was held in Kaunas, Lithuania from 15–17 August 1930.

Results

Statistics

Goalscorers

See also
Balkan Cup
Nordic Football Championship

References

External links
http://www.eu-football.info/_tournament.php?id=BtC-3

1930
1930–31 in European football
1930 in Lithuanian football
1930 in Latvian football
1930 in Estonian football
1930